In the Battle of Azaz forces of the Crusader States commanded by King Baldwin II of Jerusalem defeated Aq-Sunqur al-Bursuqi's army of Seljuk Turks on 11 June 1125 and raised the siege of the town. (One authority says the battle was fought on June 13.)

Background
Joscelin I of Edessa had captured Azaz in northern Syria from the atabeg of Aleppo in 1118. The next year the Crusaders under Roger of Salerno were severely defeated at the Battle of Ager Sanguinis, and King Baldwin II of Jerusalem was captured while patrolling in Edessa in 1123.

Prelude
In 1124 Baldwin II was released, and almost immediately he laid siege to Aleppo on October 8, 1124. This caught the attention of al-Bursuqi, the Seljuk atabeg of Mosul. Al-Bursuqi marched south to relieve the siege of Aleppo, which was nearing the point of surrender in January 1125 after a three-month siege. In spite of the city being "the greatest prize the war could offer", Baldwin cautiously withdrew without a fight.

Battle
Later, al-Bursuqi (who had received troops also by Toghtekin of Damascus) besieged the town of Azaz, to the north of Aleppo, in territory belonging to the County of Edessa. Baldwin II, Leo I of Armenia, Joscelin I, and Pons of Tripoli, with a force of 1,100 knights from their respective territories (including knights from Antioch, where Baldwin was regent), as well as 2,000 infantry, met al-Bursuqi outside Azaz, where the Seljuk atabeg had gathered his much larger force. Baldwin pretended to retreat, thereby drawing the Seljuks away from Azaz into the open where they were surrounded. After a long and bloody battle, the Seljuks were defeated and their camp captured by Baldwin, who took enough loot to ransom the prisoners taken by the Seljuks (including the future Joscelin II of Edessa).

Casualties
The number of Muslim troops killed was more than 1,000, according to Ibn al-Athir. William of Tyre gave 24 dead for the Crusaders and 2,000 for the Muslims. Fulcher of Chartres suggested 5 emirs and 2,000 soldiers dead, while Matthew of Edessa estimated 15 emirs and 5,000 troops killed.

Aftermath
Al-Bursuqi retired to Aleppo, leaving his son Masud as governor and crossed the Euphrates to Mosul, where he gathered troops to renew the fight. Apart from relieving Azaz, this victory allowed the Crusaders to regain much of the influence they had lost after their defeat at Ager Sanguinis in 1119. Baldwin planned to attack Aleppo as well, but Antioch, which passed to Bohemund II when he came of age in 1126, ceased cooperating with Edessa and the plan fell through. Aleppo and Mosul were united under the much stronger ruler Zengi in 1128, and Crusader control of northern Syria began to weaken.

Citations

Bibliography

 

 

Battles involving the Seljuk Empire
Conflicts in 1125
12th century in the Seljuk Empire
1125 in Asia
Azaz
Azaz
Azaz
1120s in the Kingdom of Jerusalem